The men's snooker doubles tournament at the 2002 Asian Games in Busan took place on 1 October 2002 at Dongju College Gymnasium.

15 teams entered for the tournament. The teams were seeded based on their final ranking at the same event at the 1998 Asian Games in Bangkok.

India (Yasin Merchant and Rafat Habib) won the gold after beating Hong Kong team of Marco Fu and Au Chi Wai in the final 3 to 1. Pakistan (Saleh Mohammad and Naveen Perwani) won the bronze medal after a 3–1 win against Chinese Taipei in bronze medal match.

Schedule
All times are Korea Standard Time (UTC+09:00)

Results

References 
2002 Asian Games Official Report, Page 285

External links 
 Official Website

Cue sports at the 2002 Asian Games